Jordan Williams may refer to:

 Jordan Williams (American football) (born 1993), American football linebacker
 Jordan Williams (basketball, born 1990), American basketball player
 Jordan Williams (basketball, born 1995), British basketball player
 Jordan Williams (Canadian football) (born 1994), Canadian football linebacker
 Jordan Williams (footballer, born 1992), English footballer who plays for AFC Fylde
 MJ Williams, also known as Jordan Williams, Welsh footballer who plays for Bolton Wanderers
 Jordan Williams (footballer, born 1999), English footballer who plays for Barnsley
 Jordan Williams (rugby union) (born 1993), Welsh rugby union player
 Jordan Williams (rugby league) (born 1997), English rugby league player
 Jordan Williams (fighter), American mixed martial artist

See also
 Jordan (name)
 Jordan–Williams House, Nolensville, Tennessee
 Jordan Williamsz (born 1992), Australian middle-distance runner
 List of people with surname Williams